The 1986 Big Sky Conference men's basketball tournament was held March 6–8 at the Lawlor Events Center in Reno, Nevada.

Sixth-seeded Montana State upset rival  in the championship game,  for their first Big Sky tournament title. The Bobcats upset host and defending champion  by a point in the first round with a field goal at the buzzer, then shocked regular season champion  by six in the semifinals.

Format
On probation, third-place  did not participate in this year's tournament, reducing the field to seven teams. Regular season champion Northern Arizona received a bye into the semifinals to play the lowest remaining seed, and the other six teams were paired up in the quarterfinals on Thursday.

Bracket

NCAA tournament
Montana State received the automatic bid to the 64-team NCAA tournament; no other Big Sky members were invited. The Bobcats were the sixteenth seed in the West regional, and lost by nine to St. John's in the first round at Long Beach, California. 

Northern Arizona and Montana played in the NIT, but both lost in the first round.

References

Big Sky Conference men's basketball tournament
Tournament
Big Sky Conference men's basketball tournament
Big Sky Conference men's basketball tournament
Basketball competitions in Reno, Nevada
College basketball tournaments in Nevada
College sports tournaments in Nevada